Angara Airlines Flight 200 was a domestic scheduled flight from Ulan-Ude Airport to Nizhneangarsk Airport, Russia. On 27 June 2019, the Antonov An-24RV aircraft operating the flight suffered an engine failure on take-off. On landing at Nizhneangarsk, the aircraft departed the runway and collided with a building. All 43 passengers survived the crash while two of the four crew, the captain and flight engineer, were killed.

Flight

Flight 200 was en route from Ulan-Ude Airport when an engine failure occurred in the left engine. The aircraft landed at Nizhneangarsk Airport at 10:20 local time (02:20 UTC). It overran the runway and collided with a building belonging to a sewage works. Two of the 47 people on board were killed and 22 were injured. The aircraft was damaged beyond repair by the accident and a post-crash fire.

Aircraft
The accident aircraft was an Antonov An-24RV, registration RA-47366, msn 77310804. The aircraft was 42 years old, having first flown in 1977.

Investigation
The Interstate Aviation Committee (MAK) opened an investigation into the accident. A separate criminal investigation was also opened.

References

External links
 Interstate Aviation Committee investigation page: English and Russian

Aviation accidents and incidents in 2019
Aviation accidents and incidents in Russia
Accidents and incidents involving the Antonov An-24
2019 disasters in Russia